Our Lady of the Sacred Heart Catholic College (often referred to as OLSH) is an Australian Marist Brother's Catholic School located in Alice Springs, Northern Territory, Australia. The college is a co-educational school split into three campuses: Transition to Year 4 (Bath Street Campus) Year 5 to Year 8 (Traeger Campus) Year 9 to Year 12 (Sadadeen Campus).

History
Our Lady of the Sacred Heart Catholic College was first established by the Missionaries of the Sacred Heart and the Daughters of Our Lady of the Sacred Heart in 1938. Bath Street Campus was the original primary school before the college expanded to a second site Traeger Campus in 1992. With the Marist Brother's administration in Catholic High School that opened in 1983, the college expanded to a third site that catered secondary classes which is now known as Sadadeen Campus in 1997.

The college celebrated its 80th anniversary in 2018.

Campus
OLSH College is split into three campuses from Transition to Year 12
 Bath Street Campus: Transition to Year 4, (Primary)
 Traeger Campus: Year 5 to Year 8 (Middle)
 Sadadeen Campus: Year 9 to Year 12 (Senior)

House system
OLSH College has four main houses that students participate in Swimming/Athletics Carnivals and events in which each house compete with each other.
 Bennett (Blue, Named after a former brother of the college, Br. Bennett)
 Gillen (Green, Named after Mt. Gillen, a significant mountain in the Alice Springs region)
 Achoa (Yellow, means "friendship" from the native Indigenous language of the Alice Springs region, Arrernte  
 Standley (Red, Named after Ida Standley, one of the first teachers in Alice Springs)

References

Schools in Alice Springs